Lifton may refer to:

 Lifton, Devon, a village in England
 Lifton Hundred, an ancient administrative unit
 Lifton railway station
 Barbara Lifton (born 1950/51), politician
 David Lifton (born 1939), author
 Jimmy Lifton (born 1955), musician
 Robert Jay Lifton (born 1926), American psychiatrist